The Marriage of True Minds is the ninth studio album by electronic music group Matmos.

Production
Drew Daniel and Martin Schmidt, the members of Matmos, spent four years conducting parapsychological experiments based on the Ganzfeld experiment. After subjects were put into a state of sensory deprivation, Daniel attempted to "transmit the concept of the new Matmos record” into their minds. Subjects were asked to describe aloud any images that entered their minds. The Marriage of True Minds was constructed using both the subjects' verbal descriptions and the band members' reenactments of these "psychic" visions.

In advance of the full-length album, Matmos released the Ganzfeld EP on October 16, 2012, via Thrill Jockey. Baltimore producer Schwarz later released a club mix of "Very Large Green Triangles" with proceeds benefiting the Maryland Food Bank.

The album was recorded and mixed at Daniel and Schmidt's Baltimore home and Snow Ghost Studio in Montana, and mastered in San Francisco by Thomas DiMuzio. The album's final track is a "polyglot reconstruction" of Buzzcocks' song "E.S.P.", from their 1978 album Love Bites.

Reception

Pitchfork Media's Jayson Greene noted that Matmos' music "has always had an antic, morbid cast to it, like a Grimm's fairy tale with all the ghoulish aspects slightly accentuated, and The Marriage of True Minds is maybe the most confident they've ever been at balancing the two sides of this equation." Heather Phares, reviewing the album for AllMusic, wrote that it "effortlessly [balances] the duo's freewheeling, meticulous, ominous, and playful sides" and "delivers some of the most abstract, and most visceral, music" in Matmos' discography.

Track listing

Personnel
Matmos
Drew Daniel – Arp 2600, autoharp, banjo, bells, editing, sampling, sequencing, sleigh bells, triangle, vocals, wood block
M.C. (Martin) Schmidt – bells, bongos, cymbals, mixing, percussion, photography, piano, processing, shaker, timpani, treated piano, triangle, tuning forks, vocals

Additional musicians and production staff
Bret Allen – mixing
John Berndt – sax (alto)
Andrew Bernstein – cowbell, roto toms, tambourine
Rose Hammer Burt – sax (baritone)
Dan Deacon – vocals
Tiffany DeFoe - sax (tenor)
Angel Deradoorian – vocals
Thomas Dimuzio – mastering
Max Eisenberg – vocals
Carl Ewing – drums, tuning forks
Owen Gardner – cello, guitar, piri
Sam Haberman – drums, percussion, triangle
Ayman Harper – stones, tap dancing, wood
Connor Kizer – trumpet
Jon Leidecker – mixing, processing
Dominique Leone – vocals
Jay Lesser – guitar
Gerry Mak – vocals
Duncan Moore – bagpipes
Edward Phillips –	vocals
Carly Ptak – vocals
Ashot Sarkissjan – violin
Ed Schrader – vocals
Pete Shelley – composer, lyricist
Clodagh Simonds – vocals
Jenn Wasner – vocals
John Wiese – noise
Leslie Winer – composer, lyricist

References 

2013 albums
Matmos albums
Thrill Jockey albums